Doom of Destiny, released in 2007, is the eleventh full-length album by the German power metal band Axxis.

Track list
"Voices of Destiny" – 1:16
"Doom of Destiny (Arabia)" – 4:09
"Better Fate" – 5:08
"Bloodangel" – 4:41
"I Hear You Cry" – 4:56
"The Fire Still Burns" – 3:49
"Father Father" – 4:12
"Revolutions" – 3:48
"She Got Nine Lifes" – 3:38
"Devilish Belle" – 5:27
"Astoria" – 5:08
"Engel Aus Hass" [bonus]

2007 albums
Axxis albums
AFM Records albums